Ensenada is a barrio in the municipality of Rincón, Puerto Rico. Its population in 2010 was 1,328. Ensenada is on the western coast and is made up of about two dozen sectors. Steps Beach, popular with surfers, is located in The Tres Palmas Reserve, which is an area between Ensenada and Puntas in Rincón.

History
Puerto Rico was ceded by Spain in the aftermath of the Spanish–American War under the terms of the Treaty of Paris of 1898 and became an unincorporated territory of the United States. In 1899, the United States Department of War conducted a census of Puerto Rico finding that the population of Ensenada barrio was 674.

Features
Tres Palmas Reserve, established by a local initiative of fishermen, surfers and other community members is located on the coast of Ensenada and Puntas barrios.

Sectors
Barrios (which are roughly comparable to minor civil divisions) in turn are further subdivided into smaller local populated place areas/units called sectores (sectors in English). The types of sectores may vary, from normally sector to urbanización to reparto to barriada to residencial, among others.

The following sectors are in Ensenada barrio:

See also

 List of communities in Puerto Rico
 List of barrios and sectors of Rincón, Puerto Rico

References

Barrios of Rincón, Puerto Rico